Fulvio Luigi Saini (born 7 March 1962) is an Italian former footballer who played as a midfielder.

Honours
Monza
Serie C1: 1987-88
Coppa Italia Serie C: 1987–88
Coppa Italia Serie C: 1990–91

References

1962 births
Living people
Italian footballers
A.C. Monza players
S.S.D. Pro Sesto players
Serie B players
People from Brianza
Association football midfielders
Footballers from Lombardy